Ortensia (foaled 16 September 2005 – 5 June 2016) was an Australian thoroughbred racehorse. A sprinter, she won Group One races on three continents. The mare died while in foal to Redoutes Choice on the weekend of 4/5 June 2016, having to be euthanized due to a tumour that developed on one of her lungs that reduced severely her ability to breathe. She has two fillies a yearling by Choisir and a weanling by Dream Ahead. Ortensia was 10 years old.

Background
Ortensia was a bay mare bred in New South Wales by L. D. Rhodes. She is one of many successful sprinters and milers sired by Testa Rossa who won six Grade One races in 1999 and 2000. Testa Rossa is currently based at the Vinery Stud in the Hunter Region, New South Wales.

2012: International campaign
After establishing herself as a successful performer in Australia, Ortensia embarked on an international campaign in 2012. Ortensia won the Al Quoz Sprint at Meydan Racecourse in March and was then sent to England for the European summer. Initial results were disappointing as she was well-beaten in the King's Stand Stakes (ninth behind the Hong Kong sprinter Little Bridge) and the July Cup (fourth behind Mayson). In July however, she was ridden by William Buick to a victory in the Group Two King George Stakes at Goodwood Racecourse and followed up a month later by taking the Group One Nunthorpe Stakes at York Racecourse. In the latter race she came from a seemingly impossible position two furlongs from the finish to win by a neck from Spirit Quartz.

Major Race Wins

See also
 List of leading Thoroughbred racehorses

References 

2005 racehorse births
2016 racehorse deaths
Racehorses trained in Australia
Racehorses bred in Australia
Thoroughbred family 2-c